The Chinese National Badminton Championships is a tournament organized to crown the best badminton players in China.

Past winners

 Chinese National Games
National City Games

Badminton tournaments in China
National badminton championships